Kenneth Sherbell (April 12, 1917 – January 23, 1998) was an American labor union leader and politician from New York.

Life
He was born on April 12, 1917, in South Coventry, Tolland County, Connecticut. The family removed to East New York, Brooklyn. He attended the public schools and graduated from Brooklyn College. While still in college, he began to work in a dry-goods store, and joined Local 65 of the Wholesale and Warehouse Workers Union, affiliated with the CIO. Later he became a union leader and became active in politics as a member of the American Labor Party. In 1939, he married Evelyn Berkowitz, and they had two children. From May 1943 to December 1945, he served in the U.S. Navy as an aviation machinist's mate, 2nd class.

In November 1946, Sherbell was elected on the American Labor ticket, with Republican endorsement, to the New York State Senate (10th D.), defeating the Democratic incumbent James A. Corcoran. Sherbell was a member of the State Senate in 1947 and 1948. At the 1948 United States presidential election, he supported Henry A. Wallace and ran on the American Labor/Wallace–Progressive ticket for re-election, but was defeated by Democrat Herbert I. Sorin.

Afterwards he remained active in organized labor, worked in group insurance, and was president of a company which offered health insurance plans for unions.

He died on January 23, 1998, in Parkway Hospital in Queens, New York City.

Sources

1917 births
1998 deaths
Politicians from Brooklyn
American Labor Party politicians
New York (state) state senators
Brooklyn College alumni
People from Coventry, Connecticut
20th-century American politicians